Bendon is an unincorporated community and census-designated place in Benzie County in the U.S. State of Michigan. The population was 208 at the 2010 census.  Bendon is located within Inland Township.

Geography
Bendon is located in the eastern part of Inland Township in eastern Benzie County. Bendon's eastern border is the Grand Traverse County line. The center of the community is at the intersection of Bendon Road and Cinder Road.

History
The settlement developed around a sawmill and was first named "Kentville" after Albert Kent, a farmer who became the first postmaster on April 24, 1888. It was given a station on the now abandoned Chicago and West Michigan Railway. The post office was renamed "Bendon" on June 30, 1892, and operated until March 31, 1954.

The community of Bendon was listed as a newly organized census-designated place for the 2010 census, meaning it now has officially defined boundaries and population statistics for the first time.

Demographics

References

Traverse City micropolitan area
Census-designated places in Michigan
Unincorporated communities in Benzie County, Michigan
Unincorporated communities in Michigan
Census-designated places in Benzie County, Michigan